A muffin is a small quick bread. 

Muffin may also refer to:

Food
English muffin, a small yeast-leavened bread

Computing
Muffin (software), the default window manager and Wayland compositor shipped with the Cinnamon desktop environment

Media
"Muffin", a song by CG5, BadBoyHalo and Hyper Potions, featuring Skeppy and CaptainPuffy. 
Muffin Films, Flash animation company
Muffin the Mule, puppet character in British television programs for children
Muffins (album), 1997 album by Hoobastank
"Muffins", a viral video by Liam Kyle Sullivan
The Muffins, 1970s American band
Charlie Muffin, fictional character in the 1979 television film of the same name
Muffin Lovebird, a fictional character in the British television programme 3rd & Bird

People
Muffin Spencer-Devlin (born 1953), American golfer

Other uses
 
 
Muffin Butte, a summit in Utah, US
Muffin Islands, an island in Alaska, US
Muffin top, a form of obesity
The Muffin Man (disambiguation)